Château de la Verrerie may refer to:

 Château de la Verrerie (Saône-et-Loire)
 Château de la Verrerie (Cher)